X25  may refer to:
 HMS X25, a X20-type X class submarine
 X25, an Intel SSD

X-25 may refer to :
Bensen X-25, an experimental aircraft

X.25 may refer to :
X.25, a protocol suite for wide area networks